John Homer Copp (January 14, 1882 – May 6, 1944) was an American politician who served in the Virginia House of Delegates.

Early life
Copp's mother was Ella K. Copp.

Career
In 1919, he was the Republican candidate for Shenandoah County in the Virginia House of Delegates, against Democratic candidate George H. Snarr. He won with 1,872 votes compared to Snarr's 1,243.

Personal life
Copp and his wife, Edna, had two daughters (Mary and Frances) and a son (John A. Copp).

Copp was killed on May 6, 1944, while driving on Route 631 near Strasburg, where he lived. His car was hit by a Baltimore and Ohio Railroad train and he died on the scene.

References

External links

1882 births
1944 deaths
Republican Party members of the Virginia House of Delegates
20th-century American politicians
People from Shenandoah County, Virginia